Sodium-hydrogen antiporter 3 regulator 1 is a regulator of Sodium-hydrogen antiporter 3. It is encoded by the gene SLC9A3R1. It is also known as ERM Binding Protein 50 (EBP50) or Na+/H+ Exchanger Regulatory Factor (NHERF1).  It is believed to interact via long-range allostery, involving significant protein dynamics.

Mechanism
Members of the ezrin (VIL2; MIM 123900)-radixin (RDX; MIM 179410)-moesin (MSN; MIM 309845) (ERM) protein family are highly concentrated in the apical aspect of polarized epithelial cells. These cells are studded with microvilli containing bundles of actin filaments, which must attach to the membrane to assemble and maintain the microvilli. The ERM proteins, together with merlin, the NF2 (MIM 607379) gene product, are thought to be linkers between integral membrane and cytoskeletal proteins, and they bind directly to actin in vitro. Actin cytoskeleton reorganization requires the activation of a sodium/hydrogen exchanger (SLC9A3; MIM 182307). SLC9A3R1 is an ERM-binding protein.[supplied by OMIM]

Interactions
Sodium-hydrogen antiporter 3 regulator 1 has been shown to interact with:

 ADRB2, 
 Beta-catenin, 
 CFTR, 
 GNAQ, 
 OPRK1, 
 PAG1, 
 PDGFRA,
 PDGFRB, 
 PDZK1, 
 PTH1R, 
 SLC4A8, 
 YAP1,  and
 EZR

See also
 Cystic fibrosis transmembrane conductance regulator
 Ezrin
 Moesin
 Neutron spin echo
 Radixin
 Solute carrier family

References

Further reading

Solute carrier family